In 1918, Bloomington, Minnesota opened its first secondary school, Bloomington High School at 10025 Penn Ave. S., the school remaining at this location until a new building opened in the fall of 1957.
The new Bloomington High School at (8900 Queen Ave. S., Bloomington MN 55431) with the adjacent Bloomington Stadium, was renamed  Abraham Lincoln Senior High School in 1965 when a second high school, John F. Kennedy Senior High School opened. The original location, then known as the "annex", served as the tenth grade school for 1000 sophomores prior to the second high school. Robert Vinatieri was the tenth grade principal.

The school's mascot of Bloomington HS and Lincoln HS was the Bears. School colors were green and white, with gold. 
The school was a member of the Lake Conference from 1957 to 1982, preceded by membership in  the Minnesota Valley Conference. Principals of the school were P. Arthur Hoblit, Dr. Raymond Hanson and Dr. Kent O. Stever.  
Hubert Olson and Fred Atkinson served as Superintendent of Schools during the 1950s and 1960s to guide the school district to exceptional success.

Additional high schools. John F. Kennedy Senior High School opened in the fall of 1965. Thomas Jefferson Senior High School opened in 1970.

Due to declining enrollments in the late 1970s, Lincoln closed in 1982. Kennedy and Jefferson continue to play their home football games at Bloomington Stadium adjacent to the former Lincoln site.

Athletics

Buildings and structures in Bloomington, Minnesota
Defunct schools in Minnesota
Educational institutions established in 1918
Educational institutions disestablished in 1982
High schools in Bloomington, Minnesota
1918 establishments in Minnesota